The 2023 Copa del Rey de Baloncesto was the 87th edition of the Spanish Basketball King's Cup. It was managed by the ACB and was held in Badalona, in the Palau Municipal d'Esports in February 2023.

Barça were the defending champions, but were eliminated by Unicaja in the quarterfinals, who went on to win the cup for their 2nd overall.

All times are in Central European Time (UTC+01:00).

Qualified teams 
The top seven ranking teams after the first half of the 2022–23 ACB regular season qualified to the tournament. As Joventut, host team, finished between the seven first teams, the eighth qualified entered in the Copa del Rey.

Venue 
On May 16, 2022, ACB selected and announced Badalona to host the Copa del Rey in February 2023. The arena is primarily used for basketball, though it is also an habitual home for music concerts and other municipal events. The arena was built in 1991, it was opened in 1992 with a basketball game between Catalonia and Croatia; where Croatians won by 118-82 led with 30 points of Toni Kukoč and 21 point of Dražen Petrović. The arena hosted the basketball tournament of the 1992 Summer Olympics, the 1992 Olympic Basketball Tournament. It was designed by the architects Esteve Bonell and Francesc Rius, who won the 1992 European Union Prize for Contemporary Architecture for this building. It is also the home arena of Joventut, one of the most important professional basketball squads in Spain. Before the Pavelló Olímpic was built, the now 3,300 capacity Pavelló Club Joventut Badalona hosted the city basketball games and most of the other indoor sports.

Draw 
The draw was held on 23 January 2023 in Badalona, Spain. The top four ranking teams act as seeded teams in the draw of the quarterfinals. For its part, the top ranked team played its quarterfinal match on Thursday.

Bracket

Quarterfinals

Real Madrid vs. Valencia Basket

Barça vs. Unicaja

Lenovo Tenerife vs. Gran Canaria

Joventut vs. Cazoo Baskonia

Semifinals

Real Madrid vs. Unicaja

Joventut vs. Lenovo Tenerife

Final

References

External links 
 Official website 

Copa del Rey de Baloncesto
2022–23 in Spanish basketball
February 2023 sports events in Spain
2023 in Spanish sport
2023 in Catalonia